Pooja Vijay, better known by her stage name Swasika, is an Indian actress, dancer, and television presenter. She predominantly appears in Malayalam films and television shows, and has also worked in a few Tamil and Telugu films.

Personal life
Swasika, was born as Pooja Vijay to Vijayakumar (an accountant in Bahrain) and Girija and hails from Perumbavoor of Ernakulam in Kerala. She has a brother, Akash. After taking Bachelor of Arts degree in literature, she enrolled for dancing lessons.

Career
Her first film was Sundarapandi's Vaigai, a love story, her character was based on a real life individual. She then did Goripalayam (2010) by Rasu Madhuravan, in which she played the second lead. She was still a student, when she acted in the film. Her third film Maithanam (2011) got positive reviews from both the critics and the audience. She played a village girl, who "values culture and tradition" in the film. In her next venture, Kandadhum Kaanadhadum by director Seelan, she played a "city-bred college girl". She made her Malayalam debut with Cinema Company (2012) and was the lead actress in Sajeevan Anthikkad's Prabhuvinte Makkal (2012). In the 2014 Tamil thriller Panduvam she played a psychiatrist, a modern character as opposed to her earlier roles in Tamil films.

She has worked as television anchor too. In 2014, she hosted a show on Jeevan TV. She later played the lead role in a television serial named Dhathuputhri on Mazhavil Manorama. She has appeared in some advertisements also. Her next TV serial, My Marumakan  telecasted on Surya TV. In 2017, Chinthavishtayaya Seetha on Asianet rose her fame among the Malayali audience and won her several allocades. She is currently playing the lead role in Seetha on Flowers which a sequel to the later. She had signed a serial Pranayini but later opted out. She is an active presence in stage shows mainly as a dancer and is also anchoring several television shows. Apart from this, she has acted in some advertisements, dance- music video dramas, short films, albums, dance covers etc.

Filmography

Television
 Acting Credits (Television Serials)

TV shows

 Acting Credits ( Online)

Awards & Nominations

Notes

References

External links
 
 

21st-century Indian actresses
Actresses from Tamil Nadu
Actresses in Malayalam cinema
Actresses in Malayalam television
Actresses in Tamil cinema
Actresses in Telugu cinema
Indian film actresses
Indian television actresses
Living people
People from Ernakulam district
Year of birth missing (living people)